Étienne Avril (1748-1791) was a French furniture designer, or ébéniste.

Early life
Étienne Avril was born in 1748. He had two brothers, both of whom also became ébénistes.

Career
As an ébéniste, Avril mostly designed rectangular mahogany panels, framed by bronze. He became a maître-ébéniste, or master furniture designer, in 1774. A year later, in 1775, he began adding porcelain to the design of his furniture. For example, he added two nymphs made of bisque to a wardrobe he designed for the Palace of Fontainebleau. Other notable pieces of furniture include a marquetry desk with a glass door for the Mirault family, and a mahogany guéridons with leg made of gilded bronze for the Sené family.

Personal life and death
Avril resided on the rue de Charenton in the Faubourg Saint-Antoine of Paris. He died on 24 June 1791.

References

1748 births
1791 deaths
Furniture designers from Paris